Bag lady may refer to:
"Bag Lady", a 2000 single by Erykah Badu
"Bag Lady", a 1996 song by Audio Adrenaline from the album Bloom
 A pejorative term for women facing homelessness

See also
 Bag (disambiguation)
 Lady (disambiguation)